Steven Cyril DeLong (July 3, 1943 – August 18, 2010) was an American football defensive lineman who played professionally in the  American Football League (AFL) and the National Football League (NFL). He played collegiately for the University of Tennessee, and professionally for the San Diego Chargers and Chicago Bears. In 1969 with San Diego, he set a team record with 17 sacks, a mark which stood until Gary Johnson had  in 1980. He was traded from the Chargers to the Bears on July 26, 1972 for a fourth-round selection in the 1973 NFL Draft (84th overall–Jim Thaxton).

DeLong was inducted into the Virginia Sports Hall of Fame in 2000. He was the father of professional football player Keith DeLong, who also played for the University of Tennessee.

See also
 List of American Football League players

References

1943 births
2010 deaths
American football defensive ends
American football defensive tackles
Chicago Bears players
San Diego Chargers players
Tennessee Volunteers football players
American Football League All-Star players
College Football Hall of Fame inductees
Players of American football from Norfolk, Virginia
American Football League players